= Party room =

Party room may refer to:

- Party room, an Australian term for a parliamentary group
- A venue where a party takes place
